Lino DiSalvo (born June 5, 1974) is an American animator, film director, writer and voice actor.

Biography
Born in 1974 in Brooklyn, New York City, DiSalvo graduated from Vancouver Film School and joined Walt Disney Animation Studios. DiSalvo spent almost 17 years at Disney and served as Head of Animation on Frozen; supervising animator on Tangled and Bolt and animator on Meet the Robinsons, Chicken Little, 102 Dalmatians and Reign of Fire.

He served as Creative Director for Paramount Animation before joining Paris-based, ON Animation Studios as Head of Creative. He has also voiced the characters of Vinnie the pigeon in Bolt, Gristletoe Joe in Prep & Landing: Naughty vs. Nice, and Robotitron in Playmobil: The Movie.
 
DiSalvo is currently developing his next animated feature, The Badalisc, which is inspired by Italian folklore and draws heavily from his cultural heritage.

Filmography

References

External links

1974 births
Living people
20th-century American artists
21st-century American artists
21st-century American male actors
American animated film directors
American male voice actors
Animators from New York (state)
Artists from Brooklyn
Film directors from New York City
Male actors from New York City
Vancouver Film School alumni
Walt Disney Animation Studios people